St John Ambulance Australia (also known as St John) (SJAA) is a charitable organisation, dedicated to helping people in sickness, distress, suffering or danger. It is part of an international organisation that consists of eight priories that form the Order of St John. The organisation is sometimes incorrectly referred to as "St John's Ambulance" instead of "St John Ambulance".

St John First Aid training centres were established in Australia in the late 19th century. On 13 June 1883 a public meeting was held in the Melbourne Town Hall to form a local branch of the association. By the end of June 1883, a centre had been established under the leadership of Edward Neild.

The first division of the St John Ambulance Brigade (now known as St John Ambulance Event Health Services) was established in Glebe, New South Wales in 1903. A division of this organisation is still in operation today and is known as St John Ambulance Glebe Division. After this initial division was established other states followed suit, with divisions being set up in other states soon after. In 1987, the organisation adopted a single public title, "St John Ambulance Australia". The cadet movement was established in Australia in 1925 with a division in Glebe, NSW. The first Grand Prior's Badge issued outside the UK went to a cadet from Marrickville Cadet Division in 1933 named Marion Higgins.

Structure of St John 

The organisation is divided into the states/territories who have their own boards and oversee the day-to-day running of St John. Some states are also divided into regions, who oversee all branches and report to the state boards. St John Ambulance Australia has three main branches, with each one having its own specific area of operation.

Event health services 
St John provides volunteer event health & first aid services at events and emergencies. First Aid Services is divided into states, regions and divisions.

Events covered by St. John Australia include sports, such as the 2006 Melbourne Commonwealth Games, where a team of 500 members treated over 3000 casualties. Other events covered include sporting events, such as the Australian Open, music concerts and community fetes.

St John EHS volunteers support state emergency management and disaster plans in some states, in conjunction with other organisations like the State Emergency Service.

Commercial first aid training
St John is the largest first aid training organisation in Australia. Apart from its flagship Provide First Aid (a workplace first aid course), St John also offer instruction in topics such as Advanced Resuscitation, Advanced First Aid, AED (Automated External Defibrillation) and analgesic administration, remote first aid and occupational first aid.

Ophthalmic branch 
St John Ambulance in Australia raises funds and recruits staff for the St John Ophthalmic Eye Hospital in Jerusalem. Funds are raised through public donations, and income received from conducting first aid courses and selling first aid kits and merchandise.

Community care 
St John Community Care conducts programs that are specific to each state. These activities range from assisting disadvantaged youth, to providing voluntary transport and support programs for the frail and elderly.

Ambulance service

Western Australia 

In Western Australia St John Ambulance provides the ambulance service. This service is provided through a combination of paid and volunteer staff. Paid ambulance officers and paramedics are used in the metropolitan areas and larger regional centres. Volunteer ambulance officers are used in regional areas and some outer metropolitan areas.

Northern Territory 

In the Northern Territory St John Ambulance provides the ambulance service. This service is provided through a combination of paid and volunteer staff. Paid ambulance officers and paramedics are used in the metropolitan areas and larger regional centres. Volunteer ambulance officers are used in regional areas. Aeromedical role is offered by CareFlight operating an AW 139 out of Darwin.

Ranks in St. John

Cadet ranks 

^ Youth Leaders are adult members who have undertaken a specific leadership course and are ranked above youth but below all adult ranks

Adult ranks 

 N.B. Each adult rank of officer may hold specific titles within a division, region, state/territory or national headquarters, such as Divisional Superintendent or Chief Officer (Cadets).

Youth and cadet movements 

St John runs Cadet Divisions for children aged 8–17, this includes Juniors (8–11) and Cadets (11–17). These can be found in most towns or suburbs of major cities in Australia. Examples are Glebe Division and Bathurst Division in New South Wales, Greater Dandenong Division in Victoria and Playford Cadet Division in South Australia.

The youth program in Australia, focuses on developing young people in a variety of aspects. Young members are taught first aid and participate in youth development and social activities. For cadets, it is also possible to study for various 'badges'. Some of the topics available include counter-disaster, animal care and cookery.

Across most divisions, youth and cadet divisions meet once a week, in a designated place, to conduct a training night. There is a designated training program for youth and cadet divisions

Youth members within Event and Emergency First Aid Service programs attend public duties to provide first aid at various events to members of the public. These duties include things such as: Big Day Out, Royal Easter Show (NSW), National Folk Festival (ACT), AFL Games (All AFL states), NRL, Super 12, and Rugby Union games, amongst other popular events. There are also many more lower profile events, like local fetes and markets. At these duties, St John members use treatment tools such as oxygen therapy equipment, defibrillators and analgesic gases on top of the standard first aid equipment.

In most states, new youth members (minimum age 14) will be put through a Senior First Aid Course (SFA) free of charge.

St John youth also provides leadership opportunities for people of all ages. The program possesses a leadership program and a ranking system similar to the military.

First aid competitions are also held each year. In these competitions, cadets (in teams of up to 3, or on their own) are tested on their first aid skill, practical thinking and problem solving ability, and scene management skills. A national competition is held every year, at the National Cadet Camp.

Youth councils 

Each state and territory is encouraged to facilitate provision of a youth council, the National Office also facilitates the Australian Youth Council. Broadly, youth councils provide guidance to St John on issues affecting the organisation and its future development, particularly concerning the opinion and interests of young people.

In 2006, the Australian Youth Council (AYC) restructured to be made up of 16 state/territory representatives (nominated by their state/territory, including the state/territory chairperson and another representative) and 5 National portfolio holders, including a Communications Coordinator, Training and Leadership Coordinator, Research Development Coordinator, Policy Coordinator and Australian Chair. The AYC Chair also sits as a full member of the National Board of Directors for St John Ambulance Australia. The aims of the Australian Youth Council include:

 To work across St John to make it the volunteering organisation of choice for young people in Australia.
 To provide opportunity for young people to actively participate in the governance of St John.
 To provide guidance to St John that will contribute to the further development and improvement of the organisation.
 To develop young leaders in St John.
 To be relevant to young people.

The AYC usually meets in person once or twice a year, usually including the National Conference or Priory in June, and another meeting (Youth Stakeholders Weekend) later in the year, as well as teleconferences during the year which may include either the entire council or the National Team.

Youth councils consist of young people in the organisation who are aged 12 to 25 years.

States and territories of operation 
 St John Ambulance Western Australia (emergency ambulance and first aid service)
 St John Ambulance Australia Australian Capital Territory
 St John Ambulance Australia New South Wales
 St John Ambulance Australia South Australia
 St John Ambulance Northern Territory (emergency ambulance and first aid service)
 St John Ambulance Australia Tasmania
 St John Ambulance Australia Victoria

See also 
 St. John Ambulance
 Venerable Order of Saint John
 Insignia of the Venerable Order of St John
 Service Medal of the Order of St John
 Ambulance

References

External links 
 Official Website

1903 establishments in Australia
Ambulance services in Australia
Medical and health organisations based in Australia
Emergency medical services in Australia
Health charities in Australia
Organizations established in 1883
St John Ambulance